A court of assistants is a council of members belonging to professional, trade, craft or livery companies.

The term originated among the London livery companies, as 'certain senior members who manage the affairs of the City of London Companies', but may also be used by other trade associations. A court of assistants usually comprises the governing body of such organisations and may include the officials, as in the case of the Worshipful Company of Clockmakers founded in 1631: "The governing body of the Company is the Court of Assistants, comprising the Master, three Wardens and not less than ten Assistants."

Another example is the Honourable Artillery Company, which has an annual General Court open to all members: it meets in March to elect 20 Assistants. The company is governed in its civil and financial affairs by the Court of Assistants, which was first established in 1633.

References

External links 
 www.liverycommitteecourses.org

Committees
Livery companies
Management